The Passions of Girls Aloud is a four-part television series starring girl group Girls Aloud. The series premiered on ITV2 on 14 March 2008.

Premise
Filmed in the autumn of 2007, the show was based around each member achieving something they always wanted to do, other than sing:
Cheryl Cole attempted street dancing in Compton;
Sarah Harding learnt polo in Argentina;
Kimberley Walsh tried musicals in the West End;
Nicola Roberts created her own make-up range in Taiwan.

All four episodes were narrated by British comedian and actor Mathew Horne.

Episodes

Cheryl (14 March 2008)
Cole's aspiration was to be a street dancer. She had received training in ballet, ballroom and tap, but had never done any hip-hop or street dance. She met with Kenrick "H2O" Sandy and Kymberlee Jay, choreographers, in London and learned basic street dancing. She took a gymnastic lesson and also learned how to pop and lock. Cole's main problem was her lack of confidence.

Later, she flew to Los Angeles with her mother Joan. After going sightseeing around Hollywood, Cole met with Kennis Marquis, Diddy's choreographer, at the Millennium Studios. He taught her about dancing with style and swagger. He took Cole shopping for hip hop fashion, so that she fit in with the L.A. street dancers. The next day, Cole headed to Compton, one of the most dangerous areas of L.A., to dance with Tommy the Clown and his friends. He taught her "krumping" and she participated in a block party. Cole danced with two professional dancers to work on her routine further the next day.

Finally, she auditioned for a part in will.i.am's video for his new single "Heartbreaker", and got the part. The show ends with an advancing screening of the music video, which Cole's bandmates, family and friends all attended. Cole also contributed vocals to the UK radio edit of the song.

Sarah (21 March 2008)
Harding's aspiration was to play polo. During the show, Sarah trained in the United Kingdom and Argentina.

Harding had a love of horseback riding, but her skills were "rusty". She learned the basics of polo while practicing in the UK. Whilst in Argentina, Harding was set to compete in a polo competition against a successful polo team, but due to weather issues, the match was cancelled and Harding flew back home. Luckily for her, a British polo competition was available for her to take part in. Harding completed her passion when she competed against some of the best polo players across the world during a British game. Band members Cole, Kimberley Walsh and Nadine Coyle came to support her.

During the game, Harding suffered from a lack of oxygen and fell off the horse. Although she did not sustain any major injuries, she insisted that she could not remember what had happened, causing her mentor and the coach to pull her out due to scares about her health if she continued. At first, Harding was distraught about this, but support from her fellow band members and family cheered her up, and she resolved not to give up and to try polo again in the future.

Kimberley (28 March 2008)
Walsh decided to audition for a West End production of Les Misérables. She trained in both London and New York City.

Walsh met with a vocal coach in London, notorious for being difficult. She had less than a week to practice her audition. The producers of the show cast her as a whore in the song "Lovely Ladies", and she would also perform an encore of "On My Own" in character. Walsh then flew to New York City to practice with a Broadway vocal coach, as well as a coach who helped her act through facial expressions and body language. Walsh returned to London for the show. She participated in a dress rehearsal with the rest of the cast, and had to perform "On My Own" in front of them. On the night of the show, her family, Steven Ansell, and Cole came to watch her perform.

Walsh stated in an interview with Metro that the experience was hard because "the range for musicals is huge and you have to sing everything clearly. I haven't used my upper register for years."

Nicola (4 April 2008)
In Roberts' episode, she has had a passion for many years to create her own foundation for girls with fair skin like herself.

Roberts proved her point by going to a high street store, where there were no foundations for girls with such pale complexion. She met with two directors from Jelly Pong Pong, a cosmetics company. They told Roberts that creating a make-up range in two weeks could be difficult. They called in some favours, and Roberts went to Taiwan to test out various textures and shades. She personally made these decisions, and took a tour of the factory where her range was created. She also arranged a launch party for the press, her family, and her friends. She selected models and a venue, and had creative control of the launch. Her bandmates Walsh and Cole attended the launch at London's Sketch.

Dainty Doll, Roberts' make-up range, was released on 18 April 2008. The foundation was praised by The Times, which said that it "sinks in instantly, leaving a velvety second skin."

Controversy
Unlike the other four members of the band, Nadine Coyle chose not to take part in the programme. Coyle was initially going to conduct an orchestra, but pulled out due to the programme's bosses refusing to let her change her passion project to being a charity worker in Bolivia. Sarah Harding later stated in an interview that Coyle was simply more reserved than the rest of the band, and did not enjoy taking part in reality shows.

As a part of Passions, the Girls Aloud website posted a competition called "Be A Model for Nicola", which was meant to give one fan the chance to model for Nicola Roberts as part of her final task. However, it was later revealed that the winner would actually be attending the show and getting a makeover by Roberts. Roberts said that she tried to stick to her word, but the production company had the final decision.

References

External links
Girls Aloud - Official Website

Clips, Reviews and News On Girls Aloud's New TV show.

2008 British television series debuts
2008 British television series endings
2000s British reality television series
2000s British music television series
Girls Aloud television shows
ITV (TV network) original programming